Horton Hears a Who! (also known as Dr. Seuss' Horton Hears a Who! or simply Horton) is a 2008 American computer animated adventure comedy film based on the 1954 book of the same name by Dr. Seuss, produced by Blue Sky Studios and distributed by 20th Century Fox.  Directed by Jimmy Hayward and Steve Martino in their directorial debuts, the film's screenplay was written by Cinco Paul and Ken Daurio, and features the voices of Jim Carrey and Steve Carell as Horton the Elephant and Mayor Ned McDodd, respectively, alongside Carol Burnett, Will Arnett, Seth Rogen, Dan Fogler, Isla Fisher, Jonah Hill, and Amy Poehler. Recurring Blue Sky collaborator John Powell composed the film's musical score. It is the fourth screen adaptation of the book following the 1970 Chuck Jones television special, the 1987 Soviet animated short, and the 1992 Russian animated short.

The film was released theatrically on March 14, 2008 to generally positive reviews, and grossed $299 million on a budget of $85 million. Horton Hears a Who! was the third Dr. Seuss feature film adaptation, the first adaptation to be fully animated using CGI technology, the first adaptation to receive critical acclaim, and the second Dr. Seuss film starring Jim Carrey after How the Grinch Stole Christmas (2000).

Plot

In the Jungle of Nool, Horton the Elephant, the jungle’s eccentric teacher, hears a tiny yelp coming from a floating dust speck and gives chase to it before placing it on top of a pink flower. Horton finds out the speck harbors the city of Whoville and its inhabitants, the Whos, led by Mayor Ned McDodd, whose family includes his wife Sally, 96 daughters whose names all begin with the letter H, and one young son named JoJo. Despite being the oldest child and next in line for the mayoral position, JoJo does not want to be the next mayor, and he does not talk because he is so scared of disappointing his father. Once Horton begins carrying the speck with him, the city starts experiencing strange phenomena (earthquakes and changes in the weather), and the Mayor finds his attempts to caution Whoville challenged by the Town Council, led by the opportunistic yet condescending Chairman.

After he makes contact with Horton, the Mayor finds out from local scientist Dr. Mary Lou LaRue that Whoville will be destroyed if Horton does not find a "safer, more stable home". With the help of his best friend Morton the mouse, Horton decides to place the speck atop Mt. Nool, the safest place in the jungle. The head of the jungle, the Sour Kangaroo, who refuses to believe that the Whos exist, demands numerous times that Horton give up the speck as she believes he’s overshadowing her authority, but Horton refuses. Also taking force toward Horton are the Wickersham Brothers, a group of monkeys who like to cause havoc around the jungle. Eventually, the Kangaroo enlists a sinister but idiotic vulture named Vlad Vladikoff to get rid of the speck by force. He initially only agrees to do it in exchange for the Kangaroo's son Rudy, but when she threatens to hire the Wickersham Brothers to do it as she will probably change her mind, he eventually decides to do it for free.

Vlad does many attempts to steal the flower, but Horton outruns him. In a last attempt to steal it, Vlad manages to steal the flower away from Horton and drops it into a massive field of identical pink flowers causing a large tremor in Whoville. After unsuccessfully picking 2,999,999 flowers, Horton eventually recovers the flower (exactly the 3,000,000th flower), also revealing himself to the rest of Whoville. The Kangaroo eventually finds out that Horton still has the speck, and rallies the jungle community into arresting Horton, preying on their fears that their own children will become chaotic delinquents under his influence.

Upon cornering him, the Kangaroo offers Horton a final chance to renounce Whoville's existence. Horton refuses, and despite the heartfelt speech that he gives, the Kangaroo orders the animals to rope and cage him, and to have the speck and Whoville destroyed by dropping it in a pot of beezlenut oil. The Mayor enlists all of his people to make noise so that all the animals will find out they're really there, assisted by JoJo's "Symphonophone", an invention that creates a huge musical contribution and reveals that JoJo's "true" passion is music but still fails to penetrate the surface of the speck.

The Kangaroo snatches the flower from the captured Horton and prepares to drop it into the pot. Meanwhile, JoJo grabs the horn that was used to project Horton's voice, runs up the highest tower, and screams his first word which is "Yawp", breaking through the sound barrier just seconds before the speck hits the oil. Rudy grabs the flower and proclaims he hears it, and the other animals of Nool notice that they hear it too. Despite his mother's objections, Rudy returns the flower to the released Horton, while the animals, realizing the truth about the Whos' existence, turn on the Kangaroo for deceiving them. While being praised for his integrity by his neighbors, Horton forgives the devastated and regretful Kangaroo, who befriends him with a makeshift umbrella for Whoville. The film ends with the Whos and the animals of Nool gathering to recite the chorus from "Can't Fight This Feeling" by REO Speedwagon, and it is revealed that the Jungle of Nool (and Earth as a whole) is just one speck, like Whoville, among numerous others, floating in space.

Voice cast

 Jim Carrey as Horton the Elephant, a big-hearted, eccentric, goofy, naive, and outgoing elephant and teacher in the Jungle of Nool who possesses acute hearing abilities.
 Steve Carell as Mayor Ned McDodd, the eccentric and fun-loving mayor of Whoville who has 96 daughters, 1 son named JoJo and a wife named Sally.
 Carol Burnett as Sour Kangaroo, an egomaniacal kangaroo who mistrusts Horton's inquisitive nature as a threat to her legal authority over Nool.
 Will Arnett as Vlad Vladikoff, a scary, savage and murderous yet goofy, eccentric and idiotic vulture with a Russian accent hired by the Sour Kangaroo to steal Horton's flower.
 Seth Rogen as Morton, a mouse and Horton's best friend in the Jungle of Nool who does not believe his story, but still helps him. 
 Dan Fogler as The Chairman, the lead Whoville councilman who is dedicated to traditions and mistrustful of Mayor McDodd. 
 Fogler also voices Yummo Wickersham, the largest and oldest of the Wickersham apes and the leader and older brother of the Wickershams.
 Isla Fisher as Dr. Mary Lou LaRue, a professor, scientist and inventor at Who U.
 Jonah Hill as Tommy, a fat orange bear cub and one of Horton's students.
 Amy Poehler as Sally O'Malley-McDodd, Mayor McDodd's wife and mother to Jojo and her 96 daughters.
 Jaime Pressly as Mrs. Quilligan, a Russian Palooski and Jessica's mother.
 Jesse McCartney as JoJo McDodd, Mayor McDodd's quiet eldest son who does not want to be the next mayor.
 Fletcher Sheridan provides JoJo's singing voice in the film's final song.
 Selena Gomez as Helga McDodd, one of the mayor's daughters.
 Josh Flitter as Rudy Kangaroo, Sour Kangaroo's doubtful son who is much kinder than his mother.
 Niecy Nash as Miss Yelp, Mayor McDodd's secretary.
 Laura Ortiz as Jessica Quilligan, a Russian Palooski, Mrs. Quilligan's daughter and one of Horton's students.
 Colleen O'Shaughnessey as Angela, a female glummox and one of Horton's students.
 Joey King as Katie, a cute and eccentric baby yak.
 Bill Farmer as Willie, an orange bear and Tommy's dad.
 Marshall Efron and Tim Nordquist as the Wickersham Guards and brothers, Yummo's younger brothers and Henchmen.
 Heather Goldenhersh as Who Girl
 Charles Osgood as the Narrator

Production
After the critical and commercial failure of The Cat in the Hat 2003 film, Dr. Seuss' widow, Audrey Geisel, was so unhappy with the film that she then decided not to allow any more live-action feature films based on his work. In March 2005, as Blue Sky Studios was completing Robots, the studio and 20th Century Fox Animation president Chris Meledandri asked Geisel about getting the adaptation rights for Horton Hears a Who!. The art director for Robots, Steve Martino, along with story consultant and additional scene director Jimmy Hayward, created a model of protagonist Horton and some animation tests to showcase their design ideas to Geisel, who eventually agreed on "a seven-figure deal" for both the book and its predecessor Horton Hatches the Egg. Cinco Paul and Ken Daurio were then hired to write the script, to be directed by Hayward and Martino with a set release date of 2008.

Geisel was credited as a supervising producer and watched production up close, and also gave the directors full access to her late husband's archives, including his original sketches, 3-D sculptures, work done for the film The 5,000 Fingers of Dr. T. (1953), and even memos Dr. Seuss traded with Chuck Jones during the production of the Grinch TV special. For references in doing the character animation, along with footage of the voice actors performing their lines, the Blue Sky animators recorded themselves performing the script in an "acting room" to see what of their body language could translate well into the film.

To make Horton different from and look different compared to the mammoths Blue Sky worked with in the Ice Age series, he would at times able to stand and walk upright on two legs making him somewhat bipedal, in a way that made him look like "a fat man in an elephant suit". While the design had a major difference from the original book, with a bigger mouth to allow for wider facial expressions like those of Jim Carrey, as the directors noticed Horton's design in the book varied according to his emotion, the 3D wireframe tried to allow for the same effects.

Soundtrack
The original score for the film's soundtrack album was composed by John Powell. A soundtrack consisting of the film's score was released on March 25, 2008 by Varèse Sarabande. Near the end of the picture, the cast comes together and sings the song "Can't Fight This Feeling" by REO Speedwagon.

Others songs featured in the film are:

Reception

Critical reception
The site's consensus reads, "Horton Hears A Who! is both whimsical and heartwarming, and is the rare Dr. Seuss adaptation that stays true to the spirit of the source material." On Metacritic, the film has a weighted average score of 71 out of 100 based on 31 reviews, indicating "generally favorable reviews". Audiences polled by CinemaScore gave the film version an "A−" grade on an "A+" to "F" scale.

Kirk Honeycutt of The Hollywood Reporter called it "a delight, brimming with colorful, elastic characters and bountiful wit."

John Anderson of Variety wrote: "The real stars of the movie are the animators, who imbue even the overgrowth in Horton's jungle with a certain floppy Seuss-ishness."

Box office
Horton Hears a Who! grossed a total of $299.5 million on an $85 million budget. $154.5 million came from the United States and Canada, and $145 million from other territories.

In its opening weekend, the film grossed $45 million in 3,954 theaters, averaging $11,384 per theater in the United States and Canada, and ranking #1 at the box office. The film also had the strongest opening for a film starring Jim Carrey since Bruce Almighty, with the same applying to his costar in both films, Steve Carell.

The film previously had the fourth-largest opening weekend in March, behind Ice Age, Ice Age: The Meltdown and 300, and as of September 2012, it ranks on the 15th place. In the United States and Canada, Horton Hears a Who! was also the #1 film its second weekend of release, grossing $25 million over the Easter frame, in 3,961 theaters and averaging $6,208 per venue. It dropped to #2 in its third weekend grossing $17.8 million in 3,826 theaters and averaging $4,637 per venue. At the international box office it remained at #1 in its third week.

Interpretations
Horton Hears a Who!, like other Dr. Seuss creations, contains layered subtexts and messages. A major theme regards learning about universal values between vastly different places and people, as shown by the quote "A person's a person, no matter how small". This is employed on many levels: primarily with Horton and the Mayor of Whoville making contact and championing each other to the point where everyone around them eventually learns the truth about the speck that Whoville resides on; but also with the Mayor and Sour Kangaroo's relationships with their respective sons, Horton and the Mayor being challenged by Sour Kangaroo and the Chairman, the fickle herd mentality of the jungle community (save Horton's students and Morton) and Horton still forgiving Sour Kangaroo, and the ending shot of all of the worlds being specks in space.

Awards

Home media
Dr. Seuss' Horton Hears a Who! was released on DVD and Blu-ray on December 9, 2008. Three versions of the DVD are available: a single-disc edition, a 2-disc special edition, and a gift set packaged with a Horton plush. All three versions included the Ice Age short film Surviving Sid.

In the United States, the film earned $77,630,768 from DVD sales and $180,434 from Blu-ray sales for a total of $77,811,202 in video sales.

References

External links

 
 
 
 

2008 films
2008 animated films
2008 computer-animated films
2000s American animated films
2000s adventure comedy films
2000s English-language films
American adventure comedy films
American children's animated adventure films
American children's animated comedy films
American computer-animated films
Animated films based on children's books
Animated adventure films
Animated films about elephants
Animated films about families
Animated films about friendship
Animated films about kangaroos and wallabies
Animated films about mice
Films based on poems
Films based on works by Dr. Seuss
20th Century Fox films
20th Century Fox animated films
20th Century Fox Animation films
Blue Sky Studios films
Films directed by Jimmy Hayward
Films directed by Steve Martino
Films scored by John Powell
Films with screenplays by Cinco Paul and Ken Daurio
2008 directorial debut films
2008 comedy films
Horton the Elephant